CS Bourgoin-Jallieu is a French rugby union club competing in the third level of the French league system, Nationale. 

The club have been runners-up in the French championship and the French Cup competitions, and have won the Challenge Cup.

Founded in 1906 as "Club Sportif Bergusien". They play at Stade Pierre Rajon (capacity 9,441). They are based in Bourgoin-Jallieu in the Isère department in the province of Auvergne-Rhône-Alpes in France.

History
The club was established in 1906 as "Club Sportif Bergusien".

1997 season
In 1997 the club had a successful season.

Runners-up French Cup 1997
The club contested the Challenge Yves du Manoir final, losing to Section Paloise 13 to 11.

Runners-up French Championship 1997
The club made it to the 1997 final of the French championship, where they went down to Toulouse, 12 to 6 at Parc des Princes in Paris.

Winners of the European Challenge 1997
They made it to the final of the Challenge Cup, where they defeated fellow French club Castres 18 to 9 in Béziers. They played in the 1997–98 Heineken Cup, winning two of their 6 pool fixtures, missing out on the finals.

1999 season
The club had similar success in various competitions in the 1999 season.

Runners-up French Cup 1999
They again contested the French Cup, which they lost to Stade Français Paris 27 to 19.

Runners-up European Challenge 1999
As well as contesting the European Shield final, which they also lost, to AS Montferrand 25 to 16 in Lyon. The club saw similar results in their 1999–2000 Heineken Cup season to that of the 1997-98 competition, winning two of their six pool fixtures, not moving into the finals.

Double runners-up French Cup (March 2003 and November 2003) 
CS Bourgoin-Jallieu also contested the final two French Cup finals, in March 2003. They did however lose both games, being defeated by La Rochelle 22 to 20 in early 2003, and losing to Castres 27 to 26 in November 2003. In the 2002–03 Heineken Cup the club achieved its best result yet, finishing second in their pool, winning four of their six games, but still missing out on the finals. However, their 2004–05 Heineken Cup campaign was not successful at all, losing all six pool games and finishing last in their group.

2006 season
For the 2006-07 Heineken Cup home fixture against Munster, Stade de Genève which can hold over 30,000 spectators was used instead of Stade Pierre Rajon.  The attendance on the day was 16,255.

2009 season
The 2008–09 season saw both a measure of success and multiple relegation dangers. While they reached the final of that season's European Challenge Cup, losing to Northampton Saints, they spent most of the season hovering close to the drop zone. They also faced financial trouble serious enough that they were in danger of forced relegation to Pro D2. CSBJ, however, finished the league season in a safe spot (11th) and were able to provide LNR with sufficient financial guarantees to enable them to stay in Top 14 for 2009–10.

Club honours

French championship
 Runners-up: 1997
 French second division
 Champions : 1965, 1971, 1973
European Challenge Cup
 Champions: 1997
 Runners-up: 1999, 2009
French Cup
 Runners-up: 1997, 1999, 2003 (March), 2003 (November)
 Group B French Champions
 Champions : 1984
 Runners-up : 1982
 Challenge Jean Bouin
 Champions : 1995
 French Championship Reserves
 Champions : 1972 (Division Nationale), 1998 (Espoirs), 1999 (Elite B)
 Runners-up : 1997 (Espoirs)
 Cup Frantz-Reichel
 Champions : 2006, 2007
 Runners-up : 1998

Finals results

French championship

Challenge Cup

French Cup

Current standings

Current squad

2016-17

Notable former players

 
  Matias Viazzo
  Josh Holmes
  Andrew Tiedemann
  Nemani Nadolo
  Albert Vulivuli
  Alexandre Bias
  Julien Bonnaire
  Benjamin Boyet
  Benoît Cabello
  Marc Cécillon
  Sébastien Chabal
  Alexandre Chazalet
  Arnaud Costes
  Jean-François Coux
  Jean Daudé
  Yann David
  Cédric Desbrosse
  Ethan Dumortier
  Alexandre Dumoulin
  Mickael Forest
  Julien Frier
  Florian Fritz
  Stéphane Glas
  Gaëtan Germain
  David Janin
  Christophe Laussucq
  Xavier Mignot
  Olivier Milloud
  Franck Montanella
  Lionel Nallet
  Sylvain Nicolas
  Pascal Papé
  Morgan Parra
  Alexandre Péclier
  Vincent Pelo
  Julien Pierre
  Pierre Raschi
  Olivier Sourgens
  Marco Tauleigne
  Jean-François Tordo
  David Venditti 
  Sascha Fischer
  Robert Mohr
  Irakli Giorgadze
  Davit Khinchaguishvili
  Alberto Di Bernardo
  Carlo Del Fava
  Federico Pucciariello
  Silvère Tian
  Piet van Zyl
  Norm Berryman
  Roger Randle
  Alex Tulou
  Karena Wihongi
  Henari Veratau
  Ruben Spachuck
  Brando Va'aulu
  Rudi Coetzee
  Mark McKenzie
  James McLaren
  Salesi Finau
  Chris Wyatt

See also
 List of rugby union clubs in France
 Rugby union in France

References

External links
  CS Bourgoin-Jallieu Official website
 Site sur Yann David

 
Bourgoin-Jallieu
Rugby clubs established in 1906
Sport in Isère
1906 establishments in France